Kovilpatti railway station (station code: CVP) is a train station connecting the city of Thoothukudi, Tirunelveli, Madurai in the Indian state of Tamil Nadu. The station belongs to the Madurai railway division, a part of Southern Railway Zone.

Railway lines

Background
The town already existed before 1876. Kovilpatti was a water stop for steam engines after the introduction of the Southern Railways, and the establishment of textile mills like Loyal Textiles (1891) and Lakshmi Mills Ltd (1926) fueled the economic growth of the town.
Kovilpatti railway station is located at 9.17°N , 77.87°E. It has an average elevation of 106 metres (347 feet). Located 100 km south of Madurai, 55 km north of Tirunelveli and 60 km north-west of Tuticorin, Kovilpatti is situated on National Highway No. 44 NH 44, which connects Srinagar in the north and Kanyakumari in the south.

Categorisation
Kovilpatti Railway station falls under the Madurai railway division.

ATM Facilities
ATM Facilities inside Kovilpatti railway station campus

1.Near entrance
(State Bank of India ATM)

2. Entrance rightside (reach 10m)
(Tamilnadu Merchantile Bank ATM)

Nearest tourist attractions
 Tiruchendur temple & beach
 Coutrallam waterfalls
 Thoothukudi sea
 Papanasam waterfalls, Karaiyar dam
 Hare Island

References

External links

Railway stations in Thoothukudi district
Madurai railway division